The Workers' Socialist Movement (Spanish: Movimiento Socialista de los Trabajadores, MST) is a Trotskyist political party in Argentina. The MST was founded in 1992 as a split from another Trotskyist group, the Movement Towards Socialism (see Nahuel Moreno). The MST is active on a number of college campuses, including the University of Buenos Aires. The party in 2006 has suffered a crisis which led to a split. The minority founded a new organization, named Socialist Left.

References

External links
Official web site

1992 establishments in Argentina
Communist parties in Argentina
Political parties established in 1992
Trotskyist organisations in Argentina